Apollon is a Norwegian language quarterly research-oriented popular science magazine published by the University of Oslo. The title of the magazine is the Norwegian word for Apollo. Full title is Apollon: forskningsmagasin fra Universitetet i Oslo (Norwegian: Apollon: Science and research magazine from the University of Oslo).

History and profile
Apollon was launched in 1991. The magazine is one of the publications of the University of Oslo which is published on a quarterly basis. 

The magazine reports the research findings of the scholars working at the University of Oslo. Its target audience includes academics, teachers, students, politicians and those who are interested in scientific research.

References

External links

1991 establishments in Norway
Magazines established in 1991
Magazines published in Oslo
Norwegian-language magazines
Popular science magazines
Quarterly magazines published in Norway
University of Oslo